Ezzeddin Amer Faraj El Maremi (born 22 August 1998) is a Libyan footballer who last played for Métlaoui.

Career statistics

Club

Notes

References

1998 births
Living people
Libyan footballers
Libyan expatriate footballers
Association football forwards
ES Métlaoui players
Expatriate footballers in Tunisia
Libyan expatriate sportspeople in Tunisia